The Flower Book by Edward Burne-Jones (1833–1898) is a series of 38 round watercolours, each about  across, painted from 1882 to 1898. The paintings do not depict flowers; rather, they were inspired by the flowers' names. Burne-Jones called them "a series of illustrations to the Names of Flowers". "Not a single flower itself appears", according to his wife Georgiana. They were painted for his private pleasure, many while he was resting at his summer home in Rottingdean, and were described by his wife as the "most soothing piece of work that he ever did". In 1905 Georgiana, by then a widow, published a limited edition of high-quality colour facsimiles.

Themes and technique

Worked in watercolours, bodycolour (or gouache), and gold paint, the paintings reflect the landscape around Rottingdean and include favourite themes from Burne-Jones's work: Witches' Tree (no. xv) revisits the subject of The Beguiling of Merlin and Meadow Sweet (no. xxxv) features the central figures from The Last Sleep of Arthur in Avalon.

Burne-Jones collected folknames of flowers from many sources, but the greatest number were provided by Eleanor Leighton, Lady Leighton Warren, who shared her "knowledge of the names and legends belonging to flowers". In a letter to her, he wrote:

In a later letter, he added, "You see how I want to deal with them: it is not enough to illustrate them—that is such poor work: I want to add to them or wring their secret from them".

Publication
On his death, Burne-Jones left the album of flower paintings to his wife Georgiana, and she published a facsimile edition of 300 copies in 1905 in co-operation with the Fine Art Society in London. It was printed by Henri Piazza, who hand-stencilled watercolour over collotypes using the pochoir technique to produce brilliant colours.
These copies of the "Book" were sold in both bound and unbound form, with the unbound copies contained in a clamshell box.

Copies of The Flower Book are in the collections of the Birmingham Museums and Art Gallery and the Delaware Art Museum. The art publisher Taschen reprinted the book in 1994 in a modern format without using the pochoir technique.

The British Museum bought the original album of paintings from Georgiana Burne-Jones in 1909.

Prints
For the complete set of prints see The Flower Book by Edward Burne-Jones on Wikimedia Commons.

Notes

References

External links

The Flower Book Edward Burne Jones, YouTube video, 3:05, showing all 38 watercolours.

Watercolor paintings
Paintings by Edward Burne-Jones
Painting series
Angels in art
Witches in art